Bernadette Clement (born May 17, 1965) is a Canadian politician, who was appointed to the Canadian Senate as an independent Senator on June 22, 2021. She was previously mayor of Cornwall, Ontario, having been elected in the 2018 Ontario municipal elections, after serving three terms as a municipal councillor. A Black Canadian, she is the first woman and first person of colour to serve as mayor of the city, and the first Black Canadian woman to serve as a mayor in Ontario.

Born and raised in Montreal, Quebec, as the daughter of a Trinidadian father and a Franco-Manitoban mother, Clement attended the University of Ottawa, earning degrees in both civil law and common law and was called to the Ontario bar in 1991. She moved to Cornwall to begin working at what is now the Roy McMurtry Legal Clinic, ultimately becoming its executive director, and continued to work there up to the time of her appointment to the Senate. She was first elected to Cornwall City Council in 2006 as a city councillor.

She conducted her mayoral campaign on the themes of developing a more collaborative team-oriented approach to managing the city, as well as seeking a way to advance the city's proposed but long-delayed waterfront redevelopment project.

Clement also ran as a Liberal Party of Canada candidate for the electoral district of Stormont—Dundas—South Glengarry in the 2011 Canadian federal election and the 2015 Canadian federal election.

References

Living people
Mayors of Cornwall, Ontario
Black Canadian politicians
Black Canadian women
Women mayors of places in Ontario
Liberal Party of Canada candidates for the Canadian House of Commons
Politicians from Montreal
Canadian people of Trinidad and Tobago descent
Franco-Ontarian people
University of Ottawa alumni
Lawyers in Ontario
Black Canadian lawyers
1965 births
Canadian senators from Ontario
Independent Canadian senators
Women members of the Senate of Canada